Joseph Bruce McGonnigal (born May 1, 1968) is a former American football tight end on the University of Virginia football team, and was a starter at the position in 1989 and 1990. In 1989, he set an ACC record for receiving yards by a tight end in a single season, with 634.

Early years
McGonnigal played high school football at Loyola High School where he helped the Dons end a long losing streak to archrival Calvert Hall in the annual Turkey Bowl game his senior year. MCGonnigal graduated in 1986.

College career
McGonnigal has become an integral part of football folklore at the University of Virginia, where many fans tell varying accounts of how McGonnigal was injured while searching for his girlfriend's dog, some time prior to the game against Georgia Tech in 1990. McGonnigal ruptured his spleen and received a concussion from the fall incurred during the nighttime search. The spleen injury sidelined him for the rest of the 1990 season. At the time of the accident, the Virginia Cavaliers football team was ranked #1 in both major polls. Without McGonnigal, the Cavaliers fell to eventual NCAA champion Georgia Tech, 41-38.  Late in the game, with the Cavaliers trailing 38-35, quarterback Shawn Moore threw what would've been a go-ahead touchdown pass to new starting tight end Aaron Mundy; however, the play was overturned because a back-up tight end had not come onto the field causing there a penalty for too few players on the line of scrimmage.  Coach George Welsh then elected to kick a tying field goal, but the Yellow Jackets then drove for the winning field goal. Many University of Virginia football fans speculate that had McGonnigal never been injured, the Virginia Cavaliers might have gone on to win at least a share of the NCAA national championship.

Professional career
McGonnigal was drafted in 1991 by the Pittsburgh Steelers in the 9th round, but ended up with the Cleveland Browns, where he saw little playing time and closed out his brief NFL career.

After football
McGonnigal took up a career in political campaign management after leaving the NFL.

References

1968 births
Living people
Sportspeople from Cambridge, Massachusetts
Players of American football from Massachusetts
American football tight ends
Virginia Cavaliers football players
Cleveland Browns players